Mindstate is the debut album by Dutch hip hop duo Pete Philly and Perquisite released in early 2005. It was critically acclaimed and received a Zilveren Harp in 2006. Also in 2006, Mindstate was released in the United States, Canada and Australia.

In some of the instrumental parts of the album, Jesse van Ruller is featured on guitar. Talib Kweli is also featured, on the track Hope. His comment on their work is that "They're musically light years ahead of the game."

Track listing
"Intro" – 0:53
"Relieved" – 2:45
"Insomnia" – 3:10
"Motivated" – 4:36
"Eager" – 4:07
"Lazy" – 3:38
"Respect" – 3:24
"Cocksure" – 2:52
"Conflicted" – 1:50
"Grateful" – 3:53
"Mindstate" – 5:56
"Mellow" (featuring Senna Gourdou) – 6:28
"Paranoid" – 5:16
"Cheeky" (featuring Cee Major) – 4:52
"Grateful II" – 1:34
"Hope" (featuring Talib Kweli) – 4:32
"Amazed" – 9:40

Chart

References

2005 debut albums
Anti- (record label) albums
Pete Philly and Perquisite albums